William Waugh Lauder (1858 – 1931) was a Canadian pianist, music critic, teacher, virtuoso, essayist, and lecturer.

Early life and education
William Waugh Lauder was born in Oshawa, Canada, 1858. He was of Scotch, Huguenot and German descent— Armstrong ("Belted Will") and Brechleugh, Scotch; the historian Grotius, German; the Huguenot noble De Toof, French. His parents were, Abram William Lauder a parliamentarian and barrister; and Maria Elise Turner Lauder, a travel writer. 

His mother was Lauder's sole teacher until he was eleven years old. After traveling in Europe with his parents, he became a pupil of Franz Liszt.

Career
Lauder was pianist of the Toronto, Canada, "Philharmonic Society"; leader of the Anglican Choir of Leipzig, Saxony; member of the "Riedel Verein" of Leipzig; of the St. Caecilia Society of Rome, Italy. He trained choruses in Bloomington, Cincinnati, and London. He served as director of music of Helmuth College, Canada; of Eureka College, Illinois; of Cincinnati Wesleyan College, and Ohio Conservatory of Music, Cincinnati; and Professor of the New England Conservatory of Boston. He was a leading critic, teacher and virtuoso of Chicago; special critical correspondent to the Musical Courier from Chicago for the World's Columbian Exposition, and organist and choirmaster of the Central Church of Christ, Chicago.

Notes

References

Attribution

Bibliography
 
 

1858 births
1931 deaths
Canadian music critics
Canadian educators
Canadian male essayists
Lecturers
19th-century Canadian essayists
19th-century Canadian male writers
19th-century Canadian musicians
19th-century pianists
20th-century Canadian essayists
20th-century Canadian male writers
20th-century Canadian pianists